Earl Herring (born December 28, 1931) is an American former sports shooter. He competed in the skeet event at the 1968 Summer Olympics.

References

1931 births
Living people
American male sport shooters
Olympic shooters of the United States
Shooters at the 1968 Summer Olympics
People from Emmitsburg, Maryland
Sportspeople from Maryland